Sir David Akers-Jones  (14 April 1927 – 30 September 2019) was a British colonial administrator. He was the Chief Secretary of Hong Kong from 1985 to 1987, and was briefly acting Governor of Hong Kong after the untimely death of Sir Edward Youde.

Biography 
Born David Akers Jones ('Akers' being adopted as part of his surname later), he was son of Walter George Jones, manager of a brick and tile factory at Worthing, West Sussex, and Dorothy (née Akers), a schoolteacher. He was educated at Worthing High School and Brasenose College, Oxford (MA).

Akers-Jones arrived in Hong Kong in 1957, after serving three years in the Malayan Civil Service and joined the Hong Kong Government in the summer of 1957. During his long career, Akers-Jones served in many important posts in the Government of Hong Kong, including Principal Assistant Colonial Secretary, Secretary for the New Territories, which was later retitled "The Secretary for City and New Territories Administration". He was instrumental in turning small villages into "new towns"  in the New Territories teeming with factories and apartment blocks to resettle slum-dwellers from the hillsides of Hong Kong Island.

He was also Secretary for District Administration, Secretary for Home Affairs and Chief Secretary.

After the sudden death of Sir Edward Youde, Akers-Jones became Acting Governor of Hong Kong from December 1986 to April 1987. After retiring from the post of Chief Secretary in 1987, he became Special Assistant to Governor Lord Wilson of Tillyorn for six months. He was later Chairman of the Hong Kong Housing Authority, from 1987 to 1992.

In the years leading up to the transfer of sovereignty from the UK to the People's Republic of China (PRC) in 1997, Akers-Jones was appointed as a Hong Kong Affairs Advisor to the Central Government of the PRC, from 1992 to 1997, after he relinquished chairmanship of the Hong Kong Housing Authority, having served a five-year term.

Sir David Akers-Jones retired and lived quietly in Hong Kong.  He and his wife bought the dilapidated secluded villa "Dragon View", in Sham Tseng, for HK$1.5 million. The couple renovated it and worked extensively on the garden. They were served with a compulsory purchase order on 19 October 2000 when it was decided to go ahead with a road widening project. He is thought to have obtained at least $30 million in compensation.

Discovery Bay controversy 
In 2005, Akers-Jones briefly emerged from retirement to defend, before Hong Kong's Legislative Council, his role in zoning the Discovery Bay resort project on Lantau in the 1970s. Developers were allowed to build there with the stipulation that it would become a resort but most of the units were later converted into luxury housing. He was involved in the original zoning decision enabling development, as the then Secretary for the New Territories. With Hong Kong Disneyland subsequently opening nearby and property prices having skyrocketed as a result, suspicions about the fact that the original zoning plan was never enforced have again come to the fore. Akers-Jones criticised the decision to call on an elderly man to testify about events 30 years earlier. He revealed that colonial officials had abruptly changed the zoning of the Discovery Bay project, and gave it to new developers because they feared it would fall into the hands of the former Soviet Union.

Political views 
Akers-Jones criticised Hong Kong's post-colonial government for continuing a policy of maintaining high property prices, its lack of urban planning, and frequently ill-conceived plans to reclaim land in Victoria Harbour.

Akers-Jones advocated converting the Election Committee into a committee which would nominate suitable candidates for the post of chief executive for election by the public. He further believed in preserving functional constituencies but that they should be turned into an upper house in a bicameral legislature instead of abolishing them.

Memoirs 
In later life, Akers-Jones penned occasional letters to the South China Morning Post and wrote occasional columns there and at The Standard.  In 2004, he published a volume of reminiscences, entitled Feeling the Stones.

Benevolent work 
Akers-Jones was honorary chairman of the Bridge to China foundation, or Wu Zhi Qiao, which is a charitable, non-profit organisation based in Hong Kong dedicated to building footbridges in rural mainland China. It was established in 2005 as a collaborative effort between the Chinese University of Hong Kong, the Hong Kong Polytechnic University, and Xi'an Jiaotong University to build a single footbridge across the Po River in Gansu province.  The foundation ultimately formed partnerships with 17 universities in China, Hong Kong, and the United States.

He was a founder and the honorary president of the local chapter of Outward Bound, the Outward Bound Hong Kong. He was a vice-president of the Hong Kong Girl Guides Association.   He was vice-patron and honorary life president of the Hong Kong Football Association.

Akers-Jones was a trustee and vice-president of the Worldwide Fund for Nature Hong Kong and chairman of the Jackie Chan Charitable Foundation

Akers-Jones was chairman of Operation Smile China Medical Mission and president of the English-Speaking Union (Hong Kong).  He was honorary advisor to Musicus Society.

In 2014, Akers-Jones founded Invotech, a do-tank to spread innovation and technology in Hong Kong.

Personal life
In 1951, Akers-Jones married Jane Spickernell, daughter of Royal Navy Captain Sir Frank Todd Spickernell, KBE, CB, CVO, DSO, and maternal granddaughter of Sir Delves Louis Broughton, 10th Baronet. Jane Akers-Jones was appointed MBE in 1988. They had two adoptive children, a son named Simon (d. 1981) and a daughter, Byrony.

Death
Akers-Jones died from colorectal cancer at Queen Elizabeth Hospital on 30 September 2019 at age 92. His wife Jane had died in 2002.

References

Citations

Sources 

 
 Akers-Jones, Sir David International Who's Who. Retrieved 3 September 2006.

1927 births
2019 deaths
20th-century British politicians
20th-century Hong Kong people
Alumni of the University of Kent
Business and Professionals Federation of Hong Kong politicians
Chief Secretaries of Hong Kong
Companions of the Order of St Michael and St George
Deaths from cancer in Hong Kong
Deaths from colorectal cancer
English emigrants to Hong Kong
Governors of Hong Kong
HK LegCo Members 1985–1988
Hong Kong Affairs Advisors
Hong Kong justices of the peace
Hong Kong people of British descent
Hong Kong Anglicans
Hong Kong people of English descent
Knights Commander of the Order of the British Empire
Members of the Selection Committee of Hong Kong
People educated at Worthing High School
People from Worthing
Recipients of the Grand Bauhinia Medal